Joe Daley (born October 30, 1960) is an American professional golfer formerly of the PGA Tour and Nationwide Tour. He now plays on the PGA Tour Champions. On 1 July 2012, Daley won the Senior Players Championship for his first major victory on the Champions Tour.

Professional career

Daley was born in Chestnut Hill, Pennsylvania, attended and played golf at Plymouth-Whitemarsh High School before walking on to the golf team at Old Dominion University. He did not turn pro until 1992 at the age of 32, having been a wholesale credit manager since graduating from college. 

Daley played on the Nationwide Tour in 1997 and 1999 to 2009. He earned his PGA Tour card in 1996 and 1998 and played in 60 events on the major tour. His best finish was a tie for sixth at the 1996 B.C. Open. In the 2000 PGA Tour Q-School tournament, he rolled in a five-foot putt during the fourth round, only to have the ball pop out of the off-center cup and back onto the putting surface. He missed his PGA Tour card by a single stroke.

Daley's best finish in 2007 on the Nationwide Tour was a fourth place at the Legend Financial Group Classic. He also shot his best round on the PGA Tour in 2007 during round two of the Sony Open in Hawaii. He completed 2007 ranked 66th on the Nationwide Tour money list ranking. He played the Nationwide Tour again in 2008 and had three top-10 finishes, including third place at the Livermore Valley Wine Country Championship. His low round is a 64 at the Preferred Health Systems Wichita Open. He completed the year at 59th on the money list with $113,597 in winnings so he retained his Nationwide Tour card for the 2009 season. This marked the sixth straight season that Daley earned his full-time Nationwide card. He made the cut in 14 out of 27 events in 2008, and was 10th in driving accuracy at 73.22%.

Senior career
Daley played in his first Champions Tour event at the Allianz Championship in Boca Raton, Florida in February 2011, finishing in a tie for 17th. In 2012, Daley recorded his first ever professional major top-five finish, when he tied for fourth at the Senior PGA Championship. Then later in the year at the Senior Players Championship in Pittsburgh, Daley won his first Champions Tour event and his maiden senior major with a final round of 68. He finished at 14-under-par and two strokes ahead of Tom Lehman.

In three seasons on the Senior tour, Daley has earned over $1 million. In the 2013 Champions Tour Q-School, Daley finished in the top thirty to earn partial sponsor's exemptions for the 2014 season.

For the 2013 and 2014 seasons, Daley has earned over $300,000 each year, with 2 top tens and 7 top 25s cumulatively. In the majors, Daley had a best of tie for 20th in the 2013 U.S. Senior Open. Daley also had a personal best in regular tournament of tie for 3rd in the Shaw Charity Classic in 2014.

Professional wins (3)

Nationwide Tour wins (2)

*Note: The 1997 Nike Louisiana Open was shortened to 54 holes due to rain.

Nationwide Tour playoff record (1–1)

Champions Tour wins (1)

Results in major championships

CUT = missed the half-way cut
Note: Daley only played in the U.S. Open.

Senior major championships

Wins (1)

Senior results timeline
Results not in chronological order before 2017.

CUT = missed the half-way cut
WD = withdrew
"T" = indicates a tie for a place

See also
1995 PGA Tour Qualifying School graduates
1997 Nike Tour graduates

References

External links

A pseudo-homecoming for Joe Daley

American male golfers
PGA Tour golfers
PGA Tour Champions golfers
Winners of senior major golf championships
Korn Ferry Tour graduates
Old Dominion University alumni
Golfers from Philadelphia
Golfers from Scottsdale, Arizona
1960 births
Living people